U-75 may refer to one of the following German submarines:

 , a Type UE I submarine launched in 1915 and that served in World War I until sunk 13 December 1917; laid the mine that sank , killing Lord Kitchener
 During World War I, Germany also had these submarines with similar names:
 , a Type UB III submarine launched in 1917 and sunk on 10 December 1917
 , a Type UC II submarine launched in 1916 and sunk 31 May 1918
 , a Type VIIB submarine that served in World War II until sunk on 28 December 1941

References 

Submarines of Germany